Akwasi Qwakeye Oduro  (born 8 February 1987 in Cologne) is a German-born Belgian defender of Ghanaian descent.

Career 
He emigrated to Belgium when he was ten and started playing for Gierle and K.V. Turnhout. At the age of 14 he moved to Standard de Liège who played between 2006 now moved to the first team of KSK Beveren where he played 4 matches in his first season. In August 2008 he went for a trial at English League Two club Swindon Town F.C. but has later been spotted on trial at Chesterfield F.C. He is a very quick talented young player, currently hoping to sign a deal at Chesterfield F.C. after making a good impression during his trial. Oduro left than in September 2008 his club K.S.K. Beveren and signed with FK Radnički Kragujevac of the Srpska Liga. In FK Bodø/Glimt, he is likely to play as a left winger in his new club, he has signed a contract which runs for three years.

He then returned to Belgium and played with Capellen and Turnhout in the Belgian Second Amateur Division.

Personal life 
Oduro who was born in Cologne, Germany and is of Ghanaian descent, but he holds a Belgian passport.

References

External links 
 
 

1987 births
Living people
Belgian people of Ghanaian descent
Black Belgian sportspeople
Belgian footballers
Belgian expatriate footballers
Association football midfielders
K.S.K. Beveren players
FK Radnički 1923 players
FK Bodø/Glimt players
Eliteserien players
Royal Cappellen F.C. players
KFC Turnhout players
Expatriate footballers in Serbia
Expatriate footballers in Norway
Belgian expatriate sportspeople in Norway